Nalini Weerawanni is a Sri Lankan politician. She was the Chief Minister  of Uva Province  in Sri Lanka in April 1999 till her husband Samaraweera Weerawanni resigned from the Sri Lankan Parliament and became the Chief Minister.

References

Sinhalese politicians
Sri Lankan Buddhists
Chief Ministers of Uva Province
Provincial councillors of Sri Lanka
Living people
Year of birth missing (living people)